Belal Fadl (born 1974) is an Egyptian screenplay writer, journalist and a column writer. He was born and raised in Cairo, Egypt. Fadl has roots from Alexandria.
Fadl graduated from Cairo University 1st class with honors, school of mass communications.
He began his career as a journalist at Rose al-Yūsuf then, a co-founder and secretary of Al-Dustour, then joined Al-Masry Al-Youm to write his column Istbaha being one of the most important columnists in Egypt.
 
In 2013, Fadl and  created El-Masara. at Al-Shorouk. newspaper in 2011, it is a weekly supplement that sarcastically described the current events in Egypt.
In 2001 his first script was made into a movie Thieves in KG2 directed by Sandra Nashaat. He wrote 18 movies, most of them topped the movie revenues.

Journalism 
In 1994, Fadl worked as a trainee journalist in Rose al-Yūsuf which was then a platform for the opposition liberal and leftist.
In 1995-1998, Fadl became co-founder, secretary editor and columnist in the prominent opposition newspaper Al-Dustour (closed by a presidential decree in early 1998) 
After the closure of Al-Dustour newspaper, he wrote for different newspapers and magazines including Al-Hilal, Al-Ittihad and London-based Asharq Al-Awsat.
In 2000, he co-founded  newspaper issued by the Egyptian Ministry of culture. In Al-Qahera, he worked as managing editor for several months, before he quitted to be devoted for screen writing. 
In 2005, he resumed his journalistic writings in Al-Dustour newspaper, after its reopen. He began editing a weekly page titled Qalamin accompanied by the cartoonist Amr Sleem. Qalamin introduced direct political sarcastic critique against the former Egyptian president Hosni Mubarak trying to push the boundaries and cross the usual redlines. This led him to court and prosecutors 17 times. Most notably when the Libyan dictator Muammar Gaddafi demanded the imprisonment of him and Al-Dustour editor-in chief Ibrahim Eissa because an article Fadl wrote about him titled "Alagol Al-Akhdar" meaning the Green man.
 In 2006, he began writing a weekly column in Al-Masry Al-Youm newspaper.
 Later in 2007, he began to write a daily column in Al-Masry Al-Youm titled Istebaha for 8 months, then he stopped to devote himself for writing his first TV series Hima
 In 2008, he resumed writing Istebaha which was considered to be the most daring in criticizing Hosni Mubarak regime, and contributed to raise the distribution of Al-Masry Al-Youm newspaper to be the most prevalent newspaper in Egypt.
 In 2011, moved to El Tahrir, which was launched after the Egyptian revolution of 2011 and the removal of Hosni Mubarak.
 Later in 2011, during the reign of the Supreme Council of the Armed Forces, he resumed his political satire with the cartoonist Amr Sleem issuing a two-page titled El Ma'ssara in the Egyptian newspaper Al-Shorouk.

Filmography
Belal Fadl's work:
 in 2001, one of his scripts made into his first movie, Thieves in KG2 directed by Sandra Nashaat, starring Karim Abdel-Aziz and Hanan Tork the movie was a huge hit and mastered the Egyptian Box office at that time. 
 he continued his cinematic success as he wrote 18 movies most of them topped the Egyptian box office. 
the Beach Loafer (2004) - (writer)
Khalty Faransa (2004) - (writer)
The student Cop/ :ar:الباشا تلميذ (فيلم)  (2004) - story - screenplay
Sayed the Romantic (2005) - (writer)
Aabu Ali (2005) - (writer)
Wesh Egram :ar:وش إجرام - (2005)  (writer)
Wahed Men Alnas (2006) - story and screen play
 The first Saudi feature- length film Keif al-Hal? (2006) - story and screen play with Lebanese critic Mohammed Rouda. 
Haha we tofaha (2006) - (writer)
 Awdet El Nadla (2006) (writer)
 Fe Mahatet masr (2006) (writer)
 Kharej ala el kanoun (2007) (story - screen play) 
 Swimming Boltia / Boltya EL Ayma (2008) (story and screen play). For wاich he was Awarded the National Egyptian Film Festival prize for the best screen play.
 Hima (TV series) (2008)  (writer) 
Ahl Cairo/ (people of Cairo) (2010) - (writer)
El Ragol El Ghamed Beslamto :ar:الرجل الغامض بسلامته (فيلم) (2010) (writer) 
18 Days (2011)  The film comprises 10 shorts revolving around different facets of the 18 days of the 25 January 2011 revolution which led to overthrowing former President Hosni Mubarak. The events take place in Tahrir square and outside it and is narrated from different points of view; either, against, enthusiasts, opportunists, or even indifferent. Fadl Wrote two short movies of the ten: (God’s Creation) directed by Kamla Abou Zikri and (When the Flood Hits You) directed by Mohammed Ali. the film's first premiere was in special screening in Cannes Film Festival
El Horoub TV series (2012) (writer)
 Sister Teresa TV series (2012) (writer)
 Ahl Eskendereya / people of Alexanderia (2014) (writer): the series which was produced by the official Egyptian TV was banned from screening on the state channels and the private ones also due to pressures from the state's security apparatus.In addition to the political stances of several actors in the series, including Fadl himself as well as actors Amr Waked and Basma Hassan, all vocal members of the political opposition, it is also likely that the series, directed by veteran director Khairy Beshara, is being banned because of its portrayal of a corrupt police officer.

References

External links

Belal Fadl profile on film.com
Belal Fadl's blog
Belal Fadl biography on fancast.com 
Belal Fadl profile on movies.nytimes.com
Belal Fadl's articles on Al Masry Al Yawm
Belal Fadl columns at Al-Shorouk journal 

Egyptian screenwriters
Egyptian writers
Egyptian journalists
1974 births
Living people